Micheline Kahn (3 August 1889 – 12 March 1987) was a 20th-century French harpist and pianist.

Biography 
Micheline Kahn was a pupil of Alphonse Hasselmans at the Conservatoire de Paris, where she obtained a prize for harp in 1904, at the age of 14. She worked with André Caplet to revise the score of Légende, Étude symphonique pour harpe chromatique et corde, after The Masque of the Red Death by Poe (1908) to make a version for diatonic harp. She was a professor at the École normale de musique de Paris and is the mother of composer Jean-Michel Damase.

Premieres and dedications 
Micheline Kahn premiered numerous works including:

 The Impromptu op. 86 by Gabriel Fauré in public creation at the Société Nationale de Musique, 7 January 1905
 The Introduction et allegro for harp, flûte, clarinet and string quartets by Maurice Ravel, 22 February 1907 at the Cercle musical of the Hôtel of the Société française de photographie in Paris
 The Rhapsodie pour harpe by Louis Vierne, 4 March 1909
 Une châtelaine en sa tour op. 110  by Gabriel Fauré, 30 November 1918 at the Société nationale de musique
 The Conte fantastique by André Caplet 18 December 1923, Salle Érard, with the quartet Gaston Poulet, in its version for diatonic harp
 The two Divertissements: I. à la française and II. à l'espagnol by André Caplet, 15 May 1924 at the théâtre du Vieux-Colombier.

Kahn transcribed for the harp several pieces such as the Berceuse, Le Jardin de Dolly or the Sicilienne by Gabriel Fauré.

In particular, she was the dedicatee of the Conte fantastique d'après le Masque de la Mort rouge d'Edgar Poë and of the two Divertissements by André Caplet.

References

External links 
 About Micheline Kahn (1889-1987) -- Part I

1889 births
1987 deaths
Musicians from Paris
French classical harpists
20th-century French women musicians